Rock the 40 Oz: Reloaded is a compilation album released by Leftöver Crack. It features songs from their first release, Rock the 40 Oz. also featuring songs from compilation albums, and some bonus tracks.

Track listing
 "Intro" – 1:12
 "Jesus Has a Place 4 Me (Rock the 40 Oz.)" – 3:00
 "Nazi White Trash" – 3:43
 "S.T.I. (Stop the Insanity)" – 1:57
 "Muppet N.A.M.B.L.A." – 1:40
 "The Good, the Bad and the LöC" – 1:43
 "Outro" – 0:40
 "Crack City Rockers" – 2:43
 "Muppet N.A.M.B.L.A. (Feat. The Distillers)" – 1:01
 "Atheist Anthem (4-Track Demo)" – 1:44
 "Nobody Is Free (4-Track Demo)" – 1:29
 "Rock the 4-Track Oz." – 2:25
 "Gay Rude Boys Unite (Instrumental '99)" – 6:11 (Also includes a rerecording of "Apple Pie And Police State" by Choking Victim).

Personnel
Album information contains the following accreditation information:

"Muppet Namblin" was a cover of the song "The Rainbow Connection", originally written by Paul Williams, but with  different lyrics.

Cover
The album's cover artwork is identical to their first release. On the cover are the heads of the two Columbine shooters, pasted onto the bodies of other people. At the bottom of the front cover, in Greek letters, it says "kill yerself".

References

Leftöver Crack albums
2004 compilation albums